The electoral district of Woothakata was a Legislative Assembly electorate in the state of Queensland. It was first created in a redistribution ahead of the 1888 colonial election, and existed until the 1912 state election.

Woothakata electorate covered the western Atherton Tableland and the total catchment area of the Mitchell River on lower Cape York Peninsula, including the towns of Chillagoe and Herberton. Woothakata was abolished in the 1911 redistribution being split into the existing electoral district of Cook (northern part), the new electoral district of Eacham (eastern part) and the new electoral district of Chillagoe (south-eastern part).

Members for Woothakata
The members for Woothakata were:

See also
 Electoral districts of Queensland
 Members of the Queensland Legislative Assembly by year
 :Category:Members of the Queensland Legislative Assembly by name

References

Former electoral districts of Queensland
1888 establishments in Australia
1912 disestablishments in Australia